is a private junior college in Inazawa, Aichi, Japan. It consists of two departments.

Department and graduate course

Departments 
 Department of life sciences
 Department of early childhood education

Advanced course 
 Department of caregiveing

Available certifications 
 Students can acquire the qualification of child care person in the department of early childhood education. In addition, a second class license of kindergarten teacher can be acquired in this department. The qualification of caregiver can be acquired in the advanced course.
 Second class license of junior high school teacher (subject of home economics) is in the department of life sciences. At first, a second class license of high school teacher (home economics) was set up.

See also 
 List of junior colleges in Japan
 Aichi Bunkyo University

External links
 Aichi Bunkyo Women's College

Private universities and colleges in Japan
Japanese junior colleges
Universities and colleges in Aichi Prefecture
Inazawa
Educational institutions established in 1951
1951 establishments in Japan